The 2014–15 Biathlon World Cup – Individual Men started on Wednesday December 3, 2014 in Östersund and finished on Thursday March 12, 2015 at the World Championships in Kontiolahti. The defending titlist Emil Hegle Svendsen of Norway finished on the 3rd place. Serhiy Semenov of Ukraine won the title.

Competition format
The  individual race is the oldest biathlon event; the distance is skied over five laps. The biathlete shoots four times at any shooting lane, in the order of prone, standing, prone, standing, totalling 20 targets. For each missed target a fixed penalty time, usually one minute, is added to the skiing time of the biathlete. Competitors' starts are staggered, normally by 30 seconds.

2013–14 Top 3 Standings

Medal winners

Standings

References

Individual Men